The 2022 College Basketball Invitational (CBI) was a single-elimination, fully-bracketed men’s college basketball postseason tournament featuring 16 National Collegiate Athletic Association (NCAA) Division I teams not selected to participate in the NCAA Division I men's basketball tournament or the National Invitation Tournament (NIT). The tournament began on March 19 and concluded on March 23. Semifinal and championship games aired on ESPN2. The tournament was won by UNC Wilmington.

In 2021, CBI was held for the first time in Daytona Beach, Florida, due to the COVID-19 pandemic. Previously, the tournament had been held on campus sites. In response to feedback received for the 2021 playing, CBI returned to the Ocean Center in 2022, which was the 14th edition of the tournament.

Participating teams
Teams in the CBI were seeded 1–16.
Note: Team records are before playing in the tournament

Declined invitation
There has been speculation that the following program might have declined an invitation to play in the 2022 CBI:

Bellarmine

Schedule

 Attendance not reported in box score.

Bracket

* – Denotes overtime period

References

External links
 College Basketball Invitational official website

College Basketball Invitational
College Basketball Invitational
College Basketball Inivtational
College Basketball Inivtational
Basketball competitions in Florida
College sports in Florida
Events in Daytona Beach, Florida